A statue of Christopher Columbus is installed in Pittsburgh's Schenley Park, in the U.S. state of Pennsylvania.

Description and history
The 50-foot tall bronze and granite statue was designed by the Italian American sculptor Frank Vittor and installed in 1958. In 2020, the sculpture was covered and the Pittsburgh Art Commission voted unanimously in favor of its removal.

References

External links
 

Bronze sculptures in Pennsylvania
Granite sculptures in Pennsylvania
Monuments and memorials in Pennsylvania
Outdoor sculptures in Pennsylvania
Sculptures of men in Pennsylvania
Statues in Pennsylvania
Pittsburgh